Prarostino is a comune (municipality) in the Metropolitan City of Turin in the Italian region Piedmont, located about  southwest of Turin, at the confluence of Val Chisone and Val Pellice.

Twin towns

Prarostino is twinned with:
 Mont-sur-Rolle, Switzerland (1976)

References

External links
 Official website

Cities and towns in Piedmont